Sun Jing ( 170 – 200s), courtesy name Youtai, was the youngest brother of the warlord Sun Jian, who lived during the late Eastern Han dynasty of China. He served as a general under Sun Ce, Sun Jian's son and successor, and later under Sun Quan, Sun Ce's younger brother.

Early life
Sun Jing was from Fuchun County, Wu Commandery, which is around present-day Fuyang District, Hangzhou, Zhejiang. He lived a quiet life at first, but he was always ardently devoted to his family. Exactly when Sun Jing joined his brother is unclear. It may have been as early as his campaign against the rebellious Xu Chang (172-174) and certainly by the time Sun Jian was tasked with helping to suppress the Yellow Turban Rebellion. Together with Xiang Qu and Zong Shi and between 500 and 600 men who served as guards, he was one of the first to join Sun Jian and they were all very close. During the Yellow Turban Rebellion, Sun Jing fought against the rebels at Yingchuan, Yangxi and Xihua and several engagements over Wan throughout 184. He then went with Sun Jian to Liang Province, where he participated in the battles at Meiyang (185) and Yuzhong (186) and did well. After the defeat of the Han forces at Yuzhong, Sun Jing followed his brother to Changsha, where he participated in Sun Jian's campaign against the bandits of southern Jing Province in 187 where once more he did well. When Sun Jian moved north to aid in the campaign to bring down Dong Zhuo in 191, Sun Jing fought in the battles at Liang, Yangren, Dagu and Luoyang. At Luoyang he was one of the first to break Dong Zhuo's lines and get into the city. This successful campaign was followed by a sudden battle against Yuan Shao's forces at Yangcheng, when Yuan Shao attacked his ally, Sun Jian, and the Sun forces had to quickly fall back from Luoyang to hold off his attack. Sun Jing was the first to arrive with reinforcements and was slowly pushing Yuan Shao's troops back when the main force under his brother arrived. The battle ended in victory for the Sun forces after they drove Yuan Shao's troops back. Sun Jing also went with Sun Jian on his last campaign against Liu Biao where Sun Jian was killed.

Aid to Sun Ce
When Sun Jian was killed at the Battle of Xiangyang, Sun Ben took command of the army and returned to their overlord, Yuan Shu. Sun Jing, however, was unwilling to serve Yuan Shu so he retired from military service and presumably returned home to Fuchun. In 196, Sun Ce who had conquered Wu and half of Danyang requested that Sun Jing assist him, so Sun Jing came out of retirement to fight on behalf of his nephew. He joined Sun Ce's forces at Qiantang where Sun Ce was working to defeat the warlord Wang Lang. Wang Lang had established his primary defences at the city of Guling and was able to hold his defences in the face of a few attacks by Sun Ce. After studying the situation, Sun Jing made a proposal of his own. Zhadu Crossing was a dozen or so leagues south of Guling and was shallow enough for an army to ford. He suggested crossing over Zhadu in secret, then attacking Wang Lang from the rear. Sun Ce accepted the proposal and had Sun Jing lead the attack. They had extra campfires lit to disguise the fact that some soldiers were departing in the night and Sun Jing reached Zhadu without alerting Wang Lang's forces. He crossed the river undetected and attacked Wang Lang's camp at Gaoqian. He overwhelmed the shocked defenders and secured the position. This gave Sun Ce's army a bridgehead, and he was able to cross the river unopposed.

Seeing that this victory was due in large part to Sun Jing, Sun Ce wanted to make his uncle one of his top generals. However, Sun Jing was no longer interested in military life. He refused to be a general and only accepted appointment as Colonel of Vehement Martial Might (奮武校尉), turning down all positions of major authority. Instead, he requested that he be assigned to their family's homeland, to defend the towns and villages he had grown up among. Sun Ce agreed, so Sun Jing was transferred to Wu Commandery and spent the remainder of his career protecting his home.

Death and sons
Sun Quan did eventually convince Sun Jing to accept the title of General of the Household of Illustrious Righteousness (昭義中郎將), but it was not a position of substantial command and Sun Jing always carried out his duties as before. Sun Jing's year of death is not properly recorded, but his title was passed on to his heirs. Sun Jing was survived by his five sons: Sun Hao, Sun Yu, Sun Jiao, Sun Huan and Sun Qian.

Family

See also
 Lists of people of the Three Kingdoms

References

 Chen, Shou (3rd century). Records of the Three Kingdoms (Sanguozhi).
 Pei, Songzhi (5th century). Annotations to Records of the Three Kingdoms (Sanguozhi zhu).

Sun Ce and associates
Generals under Sun Quan
People from Hangzhou
Han dynasty generals from Zhejiang